The Armistice Day centenary, signifying one hundred years since the Armistice that ended World War I on the Western Front, was marked on 11 November 2018. Commemorative events were organised in the weeks leading up to the centenary itself, including a gathering of over 70 heads of state and government in Paris. A series of Armistice Day, Remembrance Day and Veterans Day commemorations, ceremonies and speeches were held across Europe, the Commonwealth and the United States, as well as in other locations throughout the world.

Background

The Armistice of 11 November 1918 was signed near the French town of Compiègne between the Allies (led by Supreme Allied Commander Ferdinand Foch) and Germany (represented by Matthias Erzberger), after similar agreements had been made with Bulgaria, the Ottoman Empire and Austria-Hungary. The agreements made by both sides included the cessation of all hostilities on the Western Front. It was officially signed at 5:45am on 11 November and came into effect later that morning at 11am Paris time. Following the end of the war, 11 November is commemorated as a day of remembrance in multiple countries under different names (Armistice Day, Remembrance Day in Commonwealth countries and Veterans Day in the United States).

France

Timeline
Official French commemorations began on 4 November 2018, when President Emmanuel Macron and his spouse Brigitte Macron hosted German President Frank-Walter Steinmeier at the Strasbourg Cathedral. A concert was held in their presence, and the flags of France, Germany and the European Union were hoisted outside the cathedral.

In the lead up to the centenary itself, President Macron carried out a "memorial tour", visiting symbolic locations on the Western Front. The tour was met with backlash, particularly "drawing the scorn of ordinary French voters over his perceived metropolitan disregard for their pocketbook concerns." Macron also announced that writer Maurice Genevoix, author of numerous books on the First World War, would be listed on the Panthéon in 2019, alongside 14 other authors. He outlined plans to host a commemoration ceremony at the Arc de Triomphe followed by an inaugural peace forum at the Grande halle de la Villette on the occasion of the centenary.

In overseas France, which contributed to the wider French war effort, the number of Réunionese troops killed in action was readjusted to 1,693, leading to the island issuing a renewal of the plaques on its war memorials on the eve of the commemoration of the centenary.

10 November

Macron and German Chancellor Angela Merkel visited the Glade of the Armistice at Compiègne, where they laid a wreath, unveiled a reconciliatory plaque and signed a book of remembrance in a replica of the railway carriage where the Armistice was signed. The visit was symbolic as it marked the first time that French and German leaders had visited the site since 1945. Macron also met with US President Donald Trump bilaterally at the Élysée Palace, a day after Trump posted a tweet saying Europe should "first pay its fair share" of NATO in response to the former's suggestions for a continental European army.

11 November
At 11:00 CET, bells across France rang simultaneously, including at the Notre-Dame de Paris cathedral and churches in overseas territories such as Wallis and Futuna, marking a century since the armistice came into force.

The Arc de Triomphe ceremony began at roughly 11:20, with a performance of the national anthem La Marseillaise and an inspection of troops by President Macron, followed by a roll call of French soldiers killed in the preceding year and a second rendition of La Marseillaise by an army choir. The event included performances by cellist Yo-Yo Ma, French violinist Renaud Capuçon and Beninese musician Angélique Kidjo, and 1918 testimonies being read out by a group of teenage students.

Macron delivered a speech in which he denounced nationalism as a "betrayal of patriotism", and warned of the resurgence of "old demons". His address was followed by a performance of Ravel's Bolero by the European Union Youth Orchestra, after which he paid tribute at the Tomb to the Unknown Soldier. The ceremony concluded with the Sonnerie aux morts and a one-minute silence ending with the Cessez-le-feu bugle call.

The first Paris Peace Forum was inaugurated in the afternoon, with Macron, German Chancellor Angela Merkel and United Nations Secretary-General António Guterres giving opening remarks. US President Donald Trump notably did not attend, instead choosing to visit the Suresnes American Cemetery and Memorial, where he made an address before returning to Washington.

A concert was held in La Force in the Dordogne department of Nouvelle-Aquitaine. Violinist Pierre Hamel from the Orchestre Colonne performed at the concert alongside a pianist and a cellist, using a metal violin assembled by soldiers in the trenches.

The European Broadcasting Union organised a concert at the Royal Opera of Versailles with performances by the Vienna Philharmonic, entitled the "Concert for Peace."

Attendees

Over 120 foreign dignitaries, including 72 heads of state and government and representatives of several international organisations, attended the commemorations in Paris. In preparation for the events, around 10,000 police officers, gendarmes and soldiers were placed on duty. Macron hosted an official reception dinner for the dignitaries at the Musée d'Orsay on the evening of 10 November, and received them at the Élysée Palace prior to the ceremony.

While most guests were transported in groups of buses, US President Donald Trump and Russian President Vladimir Putin used their own presidential vehicles, and both showed up late at the venue; Israeli Prime Minister Benjamin Netanyahu also arrived later separately. All foreign guests were invited to a luncheon at the Élysée following the ceremony, with their consorts gathering at the Palace of Versailles.

 France
  Édouard Philippe, Prime Minister of France
 Édith Cresson, former Prime Minister (1991–1992)
 Édouard Balladur, former Prime Minister (1993–1995)
 Jean-Marc Ayrault, former Prime Minister (2012–2014)
 Christophe Castaner, Minister of the Interior
 Geneviève Darrieussecq, Secretary of State to the Minister of the Armed Forces
 Richard Ferrand, President of the National Assembly
 Anne Hidalgo, Mayor of Paris
 Gérard Larcher, President of the French Senate
 Brigitte Macron, spouse of President Emmanuel Macron
 Florence Parly, Minister of the Armed Forces
 Valérie Pécresse, President of the Regional Council of Île-de-France
 Nicolas Sarkozy, former President of France
 Jacques Toubon, French ombudsman

 International
 Africa

  Ahmed Ouyahia, Prime Minister of Algeria
  Aurélien Agbénonci, Minister of Foreign Affairs of Benin
  Roch Marc Christian Kaboré, President of Burkina Faso
  Faustin-Archange Touadéra, President of the Central African Republic
  Idriss Déby, President of Chad, and First Lady Hinda Déby Itno
  Azali Assoumani, President of Comoros
  Denis Sassou-Nguesso, President of the Republic of the Congo
  Alassane Ouattara, President of Côte d'Ivoire, and First Lady Dominique Ouattara
  Ismaïl Omar Guelleh, President of Djibouti
  Régis Immongault Tatangani, Minister for Foreign Affairs of Gabon
  Alpha Condé, President of Guinea
  Uhuru Kenyatta, President of Kenya
  George Weah, President of Liberia
  Fayez al-Sarraj, Chairman of the Presidential Council of Libya, and Nadia Refaat
  Rivo Rakotovao, acting President of Madagascar
  Ibrahim Boubacar Keita, President of Mali
  Mohamed Ould Abdel Aziz, President of Mauritania
  King Mohammed VI of Morocco
 Crown Prince Moulay el Hassan of Morocco
  Mahamadou Issoufou, President of Niger
  Muhammadu Buhari, President of Nigeria
  Paul Kagame, President of Rwanda
  Macky Sall, President of Senegal
  Nosiviwe Mapisa-Nqakula, Minister of Defence of South Africa
  Beji Caid Essebsi, President of Tunisia

 Americas
  Paulo César de Oliveira Campos, Ambassador of Brazil to France
  Justin Trudeau, Prime Minister of Canada
  Donald Trump, President of the United States, and First Lady Melania Trump

 Asia

  Nikol Pashinyan, Prime Minister of Armenia
  Elmar Mammadyarov, Minister of Foreign Affairs of Azerbaijan
  Chea Sophara, Deputy Prime Minister of Cambodia
  Ji Bingxuan, Vice Chairman of the Standing Committee of the National People's Congress of China
  Giorgi Margvelashvili, President of Georgia
  Venkaiah Naidu, Vice President of India, and Usha Naidu
  Benjamin Netanyahu, Prime Minister of Israel, and Sara Netanyahu
  Tarō Asō, Deputy Prime Minister and Minister of Finance of Japan
  Dastan Jumabekov, Speaker of the Parliament of Kyrgyzstan
  Phankham Viphavanh, Vice President of Laos
  Rami Hamdallah, Prime Minister of Palestine
  Emir Sheikh Tamim bin Hamad Al Thani of Qatar
  , Chairman of the Assembly of Representatives of Tajikistan
  Prayut Chan-o-cha, Prime Minister of Thailand
  Recep Tayyip Erdoğan, President of Turkey, and First Lady Emine Erdoğan
  Nigmatilla Yuldashev, Chairman of the Senate of Uzbekistan

 Europe

  Ilir Meta, President of Albania
  Alexander Van der Bellen, President of Austria
  Mikhail Myasnikovich, Speaker of the Council of the Republic of the National Assembly of Belarus
  Charles Michel, Prime Minister of Belgium
  Bakir Izetbegović, Chairman of the Presidency of Bosnia and Herzegovina
  Rumen Radev, President of Bulgaria
  Kolinda Grabar-Kitarović, President of Croatia
  Nicos Anastasiades, President of Cyprus
  Andrej Babiš, Prime Minister of the Czech Republic, and Monika Herodesová
  Lars Løkke Rasmussen, Prime Minister of Denmark
  Kersti Kaljulaid, President of Estonia
  Sauli Niinistö, President of Finland
  Angela Merkel, Chancellor of Germany
  Alexis Tsipras, Prime Minister of Greece
  Pietro Parolin, Cardinal Secretary of State of the Holy See
  Guðni Th. Jóhannesson, President of Iceland
  Leo Varadkar, Taoiseach of Ireland
  Sergio Mattarella, President of Italy
  Hashim Thaçi, President of Kosovo
  Raimonds Vējonis, President of Latvia
  Dalia Grybauskaitė, President of Lithuania
  Grand Duke Henri and Grand Duchess Maria Teresa of Luxembourg
  Xavier Bettel, Prime Minister of Luxembourg
  Gjorge Ivanov, President of the Former Yugoslav Republic of Macedonia
  Carmelo Abela, Minister of Foreign Affairs of Malta
  Igor Dodon, President of Moldova
  Prince Albert II and Princess Charlene of Monaco
  Milo Đukanović, President of Montenegro
  Mark Rutte, Prime Minister of the Netherlands
  Erna Solberg, Prime Minister of Norway
  Jacek Czaputowicz, Minister of Foreign Affairs of Poland
  Marcelo Rebelo de Sousa, President of Portugal
  Klaus Iohannis, President of Romania
  Vladimir Putin, President of Russia
  Aleksandar Vučić, President of Serbia
  Andrej Kiska, President of Slovakia
  Borut Pahor, President of Slovenia
  King Felipe VI of Spain
  Pedro Sánchez, Prime Minister of Spain, and Begoña Gómez
  Stefan Löfven, Prime Minister of Sweden
  Alain Berset, President and Head of the Federal Department of Home Affairs of Switzerland
  Petro Poroshenko, President of Ukraine
  Edward Llewellyn, Baron Llewellyn of Steep, Ambassador of the United Kingdom to France
 David Lidington, Chancellor of the Duchy of Lancaster and Minister for the Cabinet Office

 Oceania
  Sir Peter Cosgrove, Governor-General of Australia, and Lynne, Lady Cosgrove
  Epeli Nailatikau, former President of Fiji
  Winston Peters, Deputy Prime Minister of New Zealand, and Jan Trotman
  Tallis Obed Moses, President of Vanuatu, and First Lady Estella Moses

 International organisations

  Moussa Faki, Chairperson of the African Union Commission
  Paul Kagame, Chairperson of the African Union
  Thorbjørn Jagland, Secretary General of the Council of Europe
  Jean-Claude Juncker, President of the European Commission
  Antonio Tajani, President of the European Parliament
  Michaëlle Jean, Secretary-General of the Organisation internationale de la Francophonie
 Guy Ryder, Director-General of the International Labour Organization
 Christine Lagarde, chair and managing director of the International Monetary Fund
  Jens Stoltenberg, Secretary General of NATO
 José Ángel Gurría, Secretary-General of the Organisation of Economic Cooperation and Development
  Audrey Azoulay, Director-General of UNESCO
  Paolo Artini, Representative to France of the United Nations High Commissioner for Refugees
  António Guterres, Secretary-General of the United Nations
  María Fernanda Espinosa, President of the United Nations General Assembly
  Roberto Azevêdo, Director-General of the World Trade Organization
 Jim Yong Kim, President of the World Bank

Controversy & incidents
In October 2018, reports circulated in the French press that Philippe Pétain, who served in the Battle of Verdun and later led Nazi-aligned Vichy France, would be paid tribute at the Hôtel des Invalides alongside other World War I marshals. In response, the office of the Élysée said it didn't understand how such a tribute "ended up there", explaining that it was "not in the [official] program". President Macron in particular described Pétain as a "great soldier", while remarking that he made "disastrous choices" during the Nazi occupation. The resulting public controversy led to the tribute to Pétain being withdrawn from the schedule.

A planned visit by US President Donald Trump to the Aisne-Marne American Cemetery and Memorial on 10 November was cancelled; the White House said the decision was taken due to "bad weather". The cancellation was met with harsh criticism, particularly from former Obama national security adviser Ben Rhodes and British Conservative MP Nicholas Soames, a grandson of Winston Churchill.

During the procession to the Arc de Triomphe, Trump's motorcade passed by a topless woman who ran towards it and was quickly dragged out by French police. The radical feminist group Femen claimed responsibility for the incident. French police had already arrested three Femen demonstrators who staged a protest at the Arc de Triomphe on the morning of 10 November welcoming "war criminals". In addition, anti-Trump demonstrations were held at the Place de la République.

United Kingdom

Timeline
On 4 November, 10,000 torches were lit in the moat of the Tower of London, in an artistic installation entitled Beyond the Deepening Shadow which repeated nightly ending on 11 November.

The Shrouds of the Somme, designed by artist Rob Heard and comprising 72,396 shrouded figures representing all servicemen from the British Commonwealth with no known grave, was laid out at the Queen Elizabeth Olympic Park, being on display from 8 to 18 November 2018.

On 9 November, Prime Minister Theresa May visited the Thiepval Memorial in northern France and paid respects along with Macron. May also visited the St Symphorien Military Cemetery in Belgium, and laid wreaths at the graves of John Parr and George Edwin Ellison, respectively the first and last British soldiers killed in the war, which were attached with handwritten messages thanking those who died for being "staunch to the end" using lines from wartime poems.

Remembrance Sunday
As Remembrance Sunday in 2018 fell on 11 November, the National Service of Remembrance was held concurrently with other commemorative events in Europe.

The service at The Cenotaph in London began at 11:00 GMT, with a two-minute silence being observed in the presence of British political figures and members of the royal family, prime minister Theresa May and German President Frank-Walter Steinmeier. Prince Charles then laid the first wreath on behalf of Queen Elizabeth II.

In a reconciliatory act, President Steinmeier became the first German leader to lay a wreath at The Cenotaph. The Department for Digital, Culture, Media and Sport described his presence as "a symbol of the friendship that exists between the two countries today". Thousands marched past the war memorial and were able to lay their own wreaths, paying respect to relatives and soldiers who died in the war. Despite ongoing renovations, the Big Ben rang eleven times at 12:30 GMT. Steinmeier later attended a Westminster Abbey memorial service with Elizabeth II, and read out a passage from 1 St John 4: 7–11 in German. The Queen and several senior royal family members also attended a remembrance concert.

Similar commemorative events were held across the United Kingdom; in Scotland, Princess Anne attended a commemoration service at Glasgow Cathedral, while First Minister Nicola Sturgeon and other officials laid wreaths.

Other locations
Commemorative events took place in Canada, Hong Kong, Italy, Myanmar, and Russia on the occasion of the centenary.

Ceremonies in Kenya and Zambia were scheduled for 25 November 2018; German forces fighting in Northern Rhodesia only received news of the armistice on 14 November 1918, and eventually surrendered later that month. In Voi, the Commonwealth War Cemetery hosted a small ceremony, which was attended by British and German diplomats; a Kenyan army bugler played the Last Post during the ceremony, and wreaths were laid by a Kenyan general and some local and international visitors. The Zambian government sponsored a centenary event organised by the Zambian tourism agency in the town of Mbala, arguing that attraction to the region would unlock the "tourism and investment potential of Northern Province".

Australia 

A minute of silence was observed nationally in remembrance of Australian soldiers who fought and died in overseas conflicts. Prime Minister Scott Morrison addressed a crowd of more than 12,000 attending during a national Remembrance Day service in Canberra. A centenary extension of the Anzac Memorial in Sydney was also opened to the public.

In addition, over a thousand people attended a commemoration at the Australian National Memorial in the French town of Villers-Bretonneux.

Belgium 
National commemorations were held in the Belgian capital of Brussels. In an address, King Philippe pledged with people to keep alive the memory of the war, and to "engage together in building a world of peace." A dove and 11 pigeons were released during the memorial service.

In Ypres, a series of tributes to Commonwealth veterans was attended by the Minister-President of Flanders, Geert Bourgeois. The Last Post, traditionally performed in the evening since 1928, was additionally played at 11:00 CET for the occasion of the centenary.

In Mons, celebrations were held marking the anniversary of Canadian troops taking over the city from the Germans, in the final leg of Canada's Hundred Days. The Black Watch (Royal Highland Regiment) of Canada led a recreated Armistice parade through the city.

Hungary 
The Hungarian National Bank released a series of commemorative coins on 16 October 2018, which included a silver collector coin with a face value of 10,000 Hungarian forint and a non-ferrous metal variant with a fifth of the face value.

India 
A memorial service was held at the Delhi War Cemetery, where Indian and British delegates laid wreaths. Conservative MP Tom Tugendhat led the British delegation and was joined by Sir Dominic Asquith, British High Commissioner to India, and defence attaché Brigadier Mark Goldsack.

In a series of tweets, Prime Minister Narendra Modi paid tribute to Indian troops and pledged to "further an atmosphere of harmony and brotherhood".

Luxembourg 
A ceremony was held at the Gëlle Fra monument in the capital during the late afternoon, in the presence of Grand Duke Henri and Grand Duchess Maria Teresa of Luxembourg as well as Prime Minister Xavier Bettel. Bettel also paid tribute to war casualties.

New Zealand 
The Pukeahu National War Memorial Park in Wellington hosted an Armistice commemoration service, which was organised as part of the wider New Zealand WW100 commemorations. A 100-gun salute was held at the Wellington waterfront, and two minutes of silence were observed at 11:00 NZDT, followed by a cacophony of noise replicating how the public initially reacted to the news of the Armistice a century prior. Governor-General Dame Patsy Reddy and Prime Minister Jacinda Ardern gave speeches at the event.

United States 
The National World War I Museum and Memorial in Kansas City, Missouri hosted a ceremony in which participants and relatives of WWI veterans tolled a "bell of peace" and laid wreaths in memory of those killed in the war. The Washington National Cathedral organized a commemorative worship service.

President Donald Trump proposed that a military parade at the Capitol be held on 10 November to mark the centenary, in admiration of France's Bastille Day military parade (which Trump attended as a guest in 2017). However, Trump cancelled the proposed event in August 2018 over cost concerns, with estimates that the parade would have cost as much as US$92 million.

See also
Armistice Day
Centenary of the outbreak of World War I
First World War centenary
Paris Peace Forum
Remembrance Day

Notes

References

Works cited

Further reading
 S. Sumartojo, Experiencing 11 November 2018 – Commemoration and the First World War Centenary, Routledge, 2020. .

External links

AP Was There: Armistice brings World War I to an end
Cérémonie internationale du Centenaire de l’Armistice du 11 novembre 1918 à l’Arc de triomphe – full video on the Élysée Dailymotion channel

2018 in Europe
November 2018 events in Europe
November 2018 events in the United States
November 2018 events in Oceania
2018 in military history
First World War centenary